Kayapó do Sul was a Jê language spoken by the Southern Kayapó people of Brazil in a vast region that comprised Triângulo Mineiro, Goiás, southeastern Mato Grosso, northeastern Mato Grosso do Sul, and northeastern São Paulo (Brazil), in particular on the rivers Rio Turvo, Corumbá, Meia Ponte, Tijuco, Rio das Velhas, Rio Pardo, Sucuriju, Aparé, Rio Verde, and Taquari. Alternatively, it can be considered a historical period of Panará.

Two dialects have been identified based on scarce documentation of the language. The variety spoken in São José de Mossâmedes (as attested by Johann Baptist Emanuel Pohl and Augustin Saint-Hilaire in short wordlists) is characterized by the retention of the Proto-Goyaz Jê rhotic *r. In contrast, the variety spoken in Santana do Paranaíba (as attested by Kupfer, Carl Nehring, and Joaquim Lemos da Silva in short wordlists) and in the Triângulo Mineiro region (as documented by Barbosa in an extensive wordlist) innovated by palatalizing the rhotic (i.e. *r > j) in certain environments and has been hypothesized to be the ancestor of Panará.

Phonology 

/ʃ/ exists only in the Mossâmedes dialect. /ɲ, ŋ, h/ exist only in the Santana dialect.
 /t͡s, ⁿt͡s/ can be heard as [s, ⁿs] in free variation.

References

Jê languages
Languages of Brazil